{{Infobox Game | subject_name= Call of Cthulhu: The Card Game
| image_link=
| image_caption = Call of Cthulhu CCGs card back design
| designer= Eric M. Lang, Nate French, James Hata, Damon Stone
| publisher= Fantasy Flight Games
| players= 2
| ages= 14+
| setup_time= < 2 minutes
| playing_time= ~ 30 minutes1
| random_chance= Some
| skills= Card playing
Arithmetic
| footnotes= 1 Games may take much longer or shorter depending on a deck's play style and the number of players.
}}Call of Cthulhu: The Card Game (formerly the Call of Cthulhu Collectible Card Game) is an out-of-print card game produced and marketed by Fantasy Flight Games. It is based on Chaosium's Call of Cthulhu role-playing game, the writings of H. P. Lovecraft, and other Cthulhu Mythos fiction. In 2008, Fantasy Flight moved the game over to its Living Card Game (LCG) format, which retains the deck-building aspect of collectible card games, but without the random distribution.

It shares art and characters with FFG's other Cthulhu Mythos products Arkham Horror and Elder Sign.

Overview
Chaosium had previously been involved in the collectible card game (CCG) business in the mid-1990s, printing Mythos, its Cthulhu mythos CCG. Chaosium discontinued the game in 1997 after poor sales. In 2004, Chaosium instead licensed the property to Fantasy Flight Games (FFG), allowing FFG to produce the official Call of Cthulhu Collectible Card Game. It was designed by Eric M. Lang as a more accessible introduction to gaming in the Mythos environment and to provide a fast and lively interplay with the usual elements of the mythos (e.g. arcane tomes and secrets, paranormal investigations, the elder gods and their terrible servants, dark sinister plots, inhuman conspiracies, and dangers from beyond the stars). The game is nominally set in 1928.

FFG staffer Darrell Hardy developed the background for the game. Most of the storyline text (including card names and flavor text) was written by creative developer Pat Harrigan. In the Living Card Game format, the original story line was penned by Nate French, with the help of Dan Clark. Since 2010 all story lines have been created by the game's current developer Damon Stone.

The game

Players attach resources (taken from the cards in their hand) onto blank placeholder cards known as domains, later "draining" them by putting a drain counter on them to play various cards. Both players compete to complete stories by winning success tokens. Five success tokens wins a story; three stories wins the game. Players typically assign character cards to stories, to win struggles and gain these success tokens. Additionally, the first player to run out of cards to draw from loses the game, making deck destruction another potentially effective strategy.

The cards
Five types of card exist in Call of Cthulhu: Story Cards, Character cards, Event cards, Support cards and Conspiracy cards. All cards (except story cards) have a cost and belong to a faction (described below). Various cards have subtypes (such as investigator, tome, or location).Story cards come from a shared deck, and are the object of the game. Players compete by placing "success tokens" on these story cards. Once a player has placed 5 success tokens they win the story, earning the option to execute (or ignore) the effect written on it. Once a player has 3 story cards they win the game. Standard players use the 10 latest story cards, of which 3 randomly chosen are in play at any time. The Nameless City is a special promotional Story card that requires 10 success tokens but allows a player to win the game instantly. Another promotional story card is named "The Challenge From Beyond" (after a story written in collaboration by H.P. Lovecraft and four of his correspondents), and has the opposite effect: it cannot be won like a normal story, but players may draw extra cards by scoring "successes" at it.Character cards are a player's agents, used to attempt to complete stories. They possess a skill rating (used to succeed at stories) and may also have icons, which indicate the card's abilities during the icon struggle phase of play.Event cards have one-time effects and do not remain in play.Support cards have persistent effects, incurring lasting benefits or hindrances.
 Conspiracies are introduced in "Conspiracies of Chaos." These function similar as Story cards but are played from the players' decks.

The factions
There are eight factions in Call of Cthulhu, as well as "neutral" cards (light grey in color) that are not part of any faction. A card may only be played if a domain with that faction attached is drained (neutral cards can be paid for using any faction).The Agency: This "investigator" faction comprises the Blackwood Detective Agency, law enforcement agencies, and others involved in criminal justice. Its symbol is a badge, and its color is blue.Miskatonic University: This "investigator" faction represents the academic prowess of Lovecraft's fictional Miskatonic University, as well as other academic groups. Its symbol is a scroll, and its color is gold.The Syndicate: This "investigator" faction represents the underworld element of human society, including mobsters, killers and journalists. It mainly focuses on Danny O'Bannion's gang and its contacts. Its symbol is a dollar sign in a triangle and its color is dark brown.The Order of the Silver Twilight: This "investigator" faction is a later addition to the game and is based on the secret cabal of the same name from the Call of Cthulhu mythos, whose members must pass through successive ranks of occult initiation and ritual to emerge into the inner sanctum of the Order, there to pursue their quest for ultimate earthly - and unearthly - power. Its symbol is a trident in a cross, and its color is silver grey.Cthulhu: This "mythos" faction includes Cthulhu himself, as well as his associated cultists and monsters (such as deep ones and shoggoths). Its symbol is a squid, and its color is green.Hastur: This "mythos" faction centers on Hastur, especially his King in Yellow aspect, as well as his worshippers and minions, largely human psychopaths and monstrous Byakhees, as well as werewolves. Its symbol is the Yellow Sign, and its color is yellow.Yog-Sothoth: This "mythos" faction centers on Yog-Sothoth, and the scholars who worship it, as well as various trans-dimensional beings including Nightgaunts and Star vampires; it also hosts several undead monsters. Its symbol is a key, and its color is purple.Shub-Niggurath: This "mythos" faction centers on Shub-Niggurath and the many, many monsters she is responsible for creating (notably Dark Young, ghouls, and Dholes). Its symbol is a goat's head, and its color is red.

Availability
The Call of Cthulhu card game is currently produced in the form of a core set, featuring cards from 7 factions, neutral cards, story cards, success/wound tokens, a full-colour manual, a game board, and Cthulhu-shaped domain markers. (The 8th faction, Order of the Silver Twilight, does not appear in the core set.) The game is ready to play and decks can be made quickly by combining cards from two of the factions along with several neutral cards.

Collectible Card Game
Older products may still be available from retailers, though these cards have black borders and different backs. Official tournaments so far have been "white border only", so it is not necessary to chase down the older cards. The only reasons to do so are for fun or to complete a collection, though if intended for play, sleeves are required to disguise the different backs.

CCG sets
Arkham Edition (1st base set)
Unspeakable Tales (1st expansion)
Forbidden Relics (2nd expansion)
Eldritch Edition (2nd base set)
Masks of Nyarlathotep (3rd expansion)
Forgotten Cities (4th expansion)

Arkham Edition and Eldritch Edition also included "Premium Starter Sets" that contain two playable decks, primarily consisting of reprints from the normal sets, and a series of promo cards given as attendance awards for participating in official tournaments.

Each booster pack contains 11 cards (including 3 'uncommon' and 1 'rare'). In addition, the Arkham and Eldritch base sets offered starter sets with fixed contents, designed to introduce players to the game.

In May 2006, Fantasy Flight Games announced their decision to cease releasing cards in a CCG format, and to instead begin releasing smaller sets of cards as single decks with fixed contents in the LCG format. These "Asylum Packs" would be released once-a-month, and were initially designed to be compatible with the CCG cards. Released approximately once a month, these expansions were designed to increase the players' card pool in a balanced and affordable way. Three copies of twenty new cards are introduced in each pack, for a total of 60 cards. The initial printings of the sets included varying quantities of each card to echo the rare, uncommon, and common rarities of the original game, and this distribution may still be found in some out-of-print packs. Casual gamers can play using a single core set and have the option of using supplemental packs if they want to.

Original Asylum Packs
Spawn of Madness (first pack)
Kingsport Dreams (second pack)
Conspiracies of Chaos (third pack)
Dunwich Denizens (fourth pack)

Asylum Packs
The Asylum Packs proved to be very popular, encouraging Fantasy Flight to convert the entire game into the LCG format. On February 5, 2008, Fantasy Flight announced that they would be publishing a new "Core Set" of cards in October 2008, incompatible with the original CCG cards, and that two additional Asylum Packs, The Mountains of Madness and Ancient Horrors, would be published to follow the existing Asylum Packs and complete the first cycle, "Forgotten Lore"; all six packs were reprinted in 2011 as pieces of a unified set, with a single set icon and continuous numbering. Fantasy Flight continued printing monthly Asylum Packs, arranged into six-piece cycles, for several years.

Forgotten Lore
Spawn of Madness
Kingsport Dreams
Conspiracies of Chaos
Dunwich Denizens
At the Mountains of Madness
Ancient Horrors
Summons of the Deep
The Spawn of the Sleeper
The Horror Beneath the Surface
The Antediluvian Dreams
The Terror of the Tides
The Thing from the Shore
The Path to Y'ha-nthlei
The Dreamlands
Twilight Horror
In Memory of Day
In the Dread of Night
The Search for the Silver Key
Sleep of the Dead
Journey to Unknown Kadath
The Yuggoth Contract
Whispers in the Dark
Murmurs of Evil
The Spoken Covenant
The Wailer Below
Screams from Within
The Cacophony
The Rituals of the Order
The Twilight Beckons
Perilous Trials
Initiations of the Favored
Aspirations of Ascension
The Gleaming Spiral
That Which Consumes
Ancient Relics
The Shifting Sands
Curse of the Jade Emperor
The Breathing Jungle
Never Night
Into Tartarus
Shadow of the Monolith
Revelations
Written and Bound
Words of Power
Ebla Restored
Lost Rites
The Unspeakable Pages
Touched by the Abyss

Deluxe Expansions
In July 2012, Fantasy Flight announced that they would switch to a new distribution model: instead of the near-monthly Asylum Packs, there would be one 165-card deluxe expansion every four months, beginning with Seekers of Knowledge.

Secrets of Arkham (110 cards) Fantasy Flight has announced that the reprint will have 3 copies of each player card (i.e. 150 deck cards and 10 story cards), like the other deluxe expansions. It will be released early 2014.
The Order of the Silver Twilight (165 cards)
Seekers of Knowledge (165 cards)
The Key and the Gate (165 cards)
Terror in Venice (165 cards)
Denizens of the Underworld (165 cards)
The Sleeper Below (165 cards)
For The Greater Good (165 cards)
The Thousand Young
The Mark of Madness

Gaming Milestones

Yithian Deck
In May 2006, as a special promotion, copies of the Yithian deck''' were handed out to tournament organisers. The Yithian deck was a purposely unbalanced deck, ignoring normal deck-building rules and featuring overpowered cards representing Yithians. Since these cards are so overpowered, they are illegal in normal tournament play. This Yithian Tournament had the following special rules:

 The first-place finisher challenges the Yithian deck, as played by the tournament organizer.
 If the first-place finisher is defeated, the second-place finisher takes his spot, and so on.
 All challengers must use the same deck they played in the tourney.
 The first player to defeat the Yithian deck takes a copy of the deck home.

The Yithian Deck consists of the following promo cards:

Y1 Pnakotic Elder x6
Y2 Great Race Scientist x6
Y3 Yithian Soldier x6
Y4 Master of Time and Space x8
Y5 Displaced x4
Y6 Library at Pnakotus x8
Y7 Traveller of Aeons x2

Player Designed Cards
The winners of the Call of Cthulhu World Championship are invited to design a card that is released within the other products. These cards usually have a high power level, and the art features the likeness of the person that designed it. A number of these cards depict Tom Capor's character, the Archmage Magnus Arcanis.

Game Night Kit
On December 18, 2012, Fantasy Flight announced retailer-incentive "Game Night Kits", meant to serve as demo kits and encourage new players to get into the series. The kits include alternate art versions of existing cards to be used as prizes, as well as a unique deck box, promotional poster, and two sets of specialized wound tokens.

Programs

Servitor Program
Fantasy Flight Games have set up the Servitor program to help tournament organizers by giving tournament support, like promo cards, Sanity Certificates and access to special promotional items like the Yithian Deck, to give away as prizes.

Sanity Redemption
Older products in the line come with Sanity Points on the packaging, which range from 1 Sanity Point on boosters, to 5 on Asylum packs. Servitors are given Sanity Certificates to hand out to tournament winners. These Sanity Points could be redeemed until June 30, 2008 for items like promo cards or T-shirts.

Awards
 In 2005, Flagship magazine awarded the Call of Cthulhu CCG the title "Best Card Game of 2005."
 In 2008, InQuest Gamer magazine voted the Call of Cthulhu CCG the number 57 ranking Game of All Time saying that it "broke new ground with domain-based resource mechanics and great integration of the requisite horror and madness themes."

ReviewsPyramidDiscontinuation
On the September 22, 2015, it was announced that Fantasy Flight Games would cease all tournament support and stop developing new expansions after the 2015 World Championship. The Mark of Madness expansion, focusing on Hastur, was the last expansion, completing a cycle of expansions for all 8 factions. In total the game had 10 deluxe box expansions and 7 cycles of 6 asylum packs through the years. Fantasy Flight Games announced that they will keep the ability to reprint already released expansions on demand.

See alsoCall of Cthulhu role-playing game
Cthulhu MythosMythos'', a collectible card game based on the Cthulhu Mythos universe.
List of collectible card games

References

External links
Official Website
Call of Cthulhu on BoardGameGeek

Fiction set in 1928
Card games introduced in 2004
Card games introduced in 2008
Collectible card games
Cthulhu Mythos card games
Dedicated deck card games
Fantasy Flight Games games
Eric M. Lang games